Scott Creek is a stream in Jackson County, North Carolina, in the United States.

Scott Creek was probably named for an early settler.

See also
List of rivers of North Carolina

References

Rivers of Jackson County, North Carolina
Rivers of North Carolina